The 2008–09 Moldovan "B" Division was the 18th season of Moldovan football's third-tier league. There are 26 teams in the competition, in two groups, 12 in the North and 14 in the South.

"B" Division North

Final standings

"B" Division South

Final standings

External links 
 Official Site (North)
 Official Site (South)
 "B" Division - moldova.sports.md

Moldovan Liga 2 seasons
3
Moldova